William John Mitchell (2 December 1951 – 14 April  2017) was the artistic director of Kneehigh Theatre from 1995 until 2002 and created site-specific theatre company Wildworks in 2005.

Mitchell was born in Erith, Kent, and educated at Dartford Grammar School. He completed a foundation course at Medway School of Art and studied theatre design at Wimbledon School of Art.

He moved to Cornwall with his wife Sue in 1988 and designed a number of Kneehigh's shows including Tristan and Yseult directed by Emma Rice, The Red Shoes, and A Matter of Life and Death.

In 2006, he was made an honorary Fellow of Falmouth University.

Mitchell won the Best Director award at the Theatre Awards UK in 2011 for The Passion, a joint production between National Theatre Wales and Wildworks.
In 2015, Mitchell worked with Lost Gardens of Heligan on a show called 100: The Day Our World Changed to commemorate local people who died in WW1.

Mitchell was diagnosed with cancer in 2015, but continued to work up to his death on Wolf’s Child which was performed at Trelowarren Estate in Cornwall in July 2017.

Mitchell's attic has been recreated at Krowji, Redruth, as an artists resource space, in digital and physical form.

Productions
 A Very Old Man With Enormous Wings - 2005
 Souterrain  - 2006 - 07 Performed in Dolcoath Mine Camborne Cornwall and Stanmer Park Brighton
 The Beautiful Journey - 2009 performed in HMNB Devonport Plymouth and Wallsend Newcastle.
 The Enchanted Palace - 2010 until 2012, Kensington Palace London
 The Passion - Port Talbot, South Wales,  2011. In collaboration with Michael Sheen and National Theatre Wales

References

1951 births
2017 deaths
Alumni of Wimbledon College of Arts
Cornish culture
English theatre directors